The Imperial Japanese Navy (IJN; Kyūjitai:  Shinjitai:   'Navy of the Greater Japanese Empire', or  Nippon Kaigun, 'Japanese Navy') was the navy of the Empire of Japan from 1868 to 1945, when it was dissolved following Japan's surrender in World War II. The Japan Maritime Self-Defense Force (JMSDF) was formed between 1952–1954 after the dissolution of the IJN.

The Imperial Japanese Navy was the third largest navy in the world by 1920, behind the Royal Navy and the United States Navy (USN). It was supported by the Imperial Japanese Navy Air Service for aircraft and airstrike operation from the fleet. It was the primary opponent of the Western Allies in the Pacific War.

The origins of the Imperial Japanese Navy go back to early interactions with nations on the Asian continent, beginning in the early medieval period and reaching a peak of activity during the 16th and 17th centuries at a time of cultural exchange with European powers during the Age of Discovery. After two centuries of stagnation during the country's ensuing seclusion policy under the shōgun of the Edo period, Japan's navy was comparatively backward when the country was forced open to trade by American intervention in 1854. This eventually led to the Meiji Restoration. Accompanying the re-ascendance of the Emperor came a period of frantic modernization and industrialization. The navy had several successes, sometimes against much more powerful enemies such as in the Sino-Japanese War and the Russo-Japanese War, before being largely destroyed in World War II.

Origins

Japan has a long history of naval interaction with the Asian continent, involving transportation of troops between Korea and Japan, starting at least with the beginning of the Kofun period in the 3rd century.

Following the attempts at Mongol invasions of Japan by Kubilai Khan in 1274 and 1281, Japanese wakō became very active in plundering the coast of China. In response to threats of Chinese invasion of Japan, in 1405 the shogun Ashikaga Yoshimitsu capitulated to Chinese demands and sent twenty captured Japanese pirates to China, where they were boiled in a cauldron in Ningbo.

Japan undertook major naval building efforts in the 16th century, during the Warring States period when feudal rulers vying for supremacy built vast coastal navies of several hundred ships. Around that time Japan may have developed one of the first ironclad warships when Oda Nobunaga, a daimyō, had six iron-covered Oatakebune made in 1576. In 1588 Toyotomi Hideyoshi issued a ban on Wakō piracy; the pirates then became vassals of Hideyoshi, and comprised the naval force used in the Japanese invasion of Korea (1592–1598).

Japan built her first large ocean-going warships in the beginning of the 17th century, following contacts with the Western nations during the Nanban trade period. In 1613, the daimyō of Sendai, in agreement with the Tokugawa Bakufu, built Date Maru, a 500-ton galleon-type ship that transported the Japanese embassy of Hasekura Tsunenaga to the Americas, which then continued to Europe. From 1604 the Bakufu also commissioned about 350 Red seal ships, usually armed and incorporating some Western technologies, mainly for Southeast Asian trade.

Western studies and the end of seclusion

For more than 200 years, beginning in the 1640s, the Japanese policy of seclusion ("sakoku") forbade contacts with the outside world and prohibited the construction of ocean-going ships on pain of death. Contacts were maintained, however, with the Dutch through the port of Nagasaki, the Chinese also through Nagasaki and the Ryukyus and Korea through intermediaries with Tsushima. The study of Western sciences, called "rangaku" through the Dutch enclave of Dejima in Nagasaki led to the transfer of knowledge related to the Western technological and scientific revolution which allowed Japan to remain aware of naval sciences, such as cartography, optics and mechanical sciences. Seclusion, however, led to the loss of any naval and maritime traditions the nation possessed.

Apart from Dutch trade ships, no other Western vessels were allowed to enter Japanese ports. A notable exception was during the Napoleonic wars when neutral ships flew the Dutch flag. Frictions with the foreign ships, however, started from the beginning of the 19th century. The Nagasaki Harbour Incident involving  in 1808, and other subsequent incidents in the following decades, led the shogunate to enact an Edict to Repel Foreign Vessels. Western ships, which were increasing their presence around Japan due to whaling and the trade with China, began to challenge the seclusion policy.

The Morrison Incident in 1837 and news of China's defeat during the Opium War led the shogunate to repeal the law to execute foreigners, and instead to adopt the Order for the Provision of Firewood and Water. The shogunate also began to strengthen the nation's coastal defenses. Many Japanese realized that traditional ways would not be sufficient to repel further intrusions, and western knowledge was utilized through the Dutch at Dejima to reinforce Japan's capability to repel the foreigners; field guns, mortars, and firearms were obtained, and coastal defenses reinforced. Numerous attempts to open Japan ended in failure, in part to Japanese resistance, until the early 1850s.

During 1853 and 1854, American warships under the command of Commodore Matthew Perry, entered Edo Bay and made demonstrations of force requesting trade negotiations. After two hundred years of seclusion, the 1854 Convention of Kanagawa led to the opening of Japan to international trade and interaction. This was soon followed by the 1858 Treaty of Amity and Commerce and treaties with other powers.

Development of shogunal and domain naval forces

As soon as Japan opened up to foreign influences, the Tokugawa shogunate recognized the vulnerability of the country from the sea and initiated an active policy of assimilation and adoption of Western naval technologies. In 1855, with Dutch assistance, the shogunate acquired its first steam warship, and began using it for training, establishing a Naval Training Center at Nagasaki.

Samurai such as the future Admiral Enomoto Takeaki (1836–1908) was sent by the shogunate to study in the Netherlands for several years. In 1859 the Naval Training Center relocated to Tsukiji in Tokyo. In 1857 the shogunate acquired its first screw-driven steam warship  and used it as an escort for the 1860 Japanese delegation to the United States. In 1865 the French naval engineer Léonce Verny was hired to build Japan's first modern naval arsenals, at Yokosuka and Nagasaki.

The shogunate also allowed and then ordered various domains to purchase warships and to develop naval fleets, Satsuma, especially, had petitioned the shogunate to build modern naval vessels. A naval center had been set up by the Satsuma domain in Kagoshima, students were sent abroad for training and a number of ships were acquired. The domains of Chōshū, Hizen, Tosa and Kaga joined Satsuma in acquiring ships. These naval elements proved insufficient during the Royal Navy's Bombardment of Kagoshima in 1863 and the Allied bombardments of Shimonoseki in 1863–64.

By the mid-1860s the shogunate had a fleet of eight warships and thirty-six auxiliaries. Satsuma (which had the largest domain fleet) had nine steamships, Choshu had five ships plus numerous auxiliary craft, Kaga had ten ships and Chikuzen eight. Numerous smaller domains also had acquired a number of ships. However, these fleets resembled maritime organizations rather than actual navies with ships functioning as transports as well as combat vessels; they were also manned by personnel who lacked experienced seamanship except for coastal sailing and who had virtually no combat training.

Creation of the Imperial Japanese Navy (1868–72) 

The Meiji Restoration in 1868 led to the overthrow of the shogunate. From 1868, the newly formed Meiji government continued with reforms to centralize and modernize Japan.

Boshin War

Although the Meiji reformers had overthrown the Tokugawa shogunate, tensions between the former ruler and the restoration leaders led to the Boshin War (January 1868 to June 1869). The early part of the conflict largely involved land battles, with naval forces playing a minimal role transporting troops from western to eastern Japan. Only the Battle of Awa (28 January 1868) was significant; this also proved one of the few Tokugawa successes in the war. Tokugawa Yoshinobu eventually surrendered after the fall of Edo in July 1868, and as a result most of Japan accepted the emperor's rule, however resistance continued in the North.

On 26 March 1868 the first naval review in Japan took place in Osaka Bay, with six ships from the private domain navies of Saga, Chōshū, Satsuma, Kurume, Kumamoto and Hiroshima participating. The total tonnage of these ships was 2,252 tons, which was far smaller than the tonnage of the single foreign vessel (from the French Navy) that also participated. The following year, in July 1869, the Imperial Japanese Navy was formally established, two months after the last combat of the Boshin War.

Enomoto Takeaki, the admiral of the shōguns navy, refused to surrender all his ships, remitting just four vessels, and escaped to northern Honshū with the remnants of the shōguns navy: eight steam warships and 2,000 men. Following the defeat of pro-shogunate resistance on Honshū, Admiral Enomoto Takeaki fled to Hokkaidō, where he established the breakaway Republic of Ezo (27 January 1869). The new Meiji government dispatched a military force to defeat the rebels, culminating with the Naval Battle of Hakodate in May 1869. The Imperial side took delivery (February 1869) of the French-built ironclad Kotetsu (originally ordered by the Tokugawa shogunate) and used it decisively towards the end of the conflict.

Consolidation 

In February 1868 the Imperial government had placed all captured shogunate naval vessels under the Navy Army affairs section. In the following months, military forces of the government came under the control of several organizations which were established and then disbanded until the establishment of the Ministry of War and of the Ministry of the Navy of Japan in 1872. For the first two years (1868–1870) of the Meiji state no national, centrally controlled navy existed, – the Meiji government only administered those Tokugawa vessels captured in the early phase of the Boshin War of 1868–1869. All other naval vessels remained under the control of the various domains which had been acquired during the Bakumatsu period. The naval forces mirrored the political environment of Japan at the time: the domains retained their political as well as military independence from the Imperial government. Katsu Kaishū a former Tokugawa navy leader, was brought into the government as Vice Minister of the Navy in 1872, and became the first Minister of the Navy from 1873 until 1878 because of his naval experience and his ability to control Tokugawa personnel who retained positions in the government naval forces. Upon assuming office Katsu Kaishu recommended the rapid centralization of all naval forces – government and domain – under one agency. The nascent Meiji government in its first years did not have the necessary political and military force to implement such a policy and so, like much of the government, the naval forces retained a decentralized structure in most of 1869 through 1870.

The incident involving Enomoto Takeaki's refusal to surrender and his escape to Hokkaidō with a large part of the former Tokugawa Navy's best warships embarrassed the Meiji government politically. The imperial side had to rely on considerable naval assistance from the most powerful domains as the government did not have enough naval power to put down the rebellion on its own. Although the rebel forces in Hokkaidō surrendered, the government's response to the rebellion demonstrated the need for a strong centralized naval force. Even before the rebellion the restoration leaders had realized the need for greater political, economic and military centralization and by August 1869 most of the domains had returned their lands and population registers to the government. In 1871 the domains were abolished altogether and as with the political context the centralization of the navy began with the domains donating their forces to the central government. As a result, in 1871 Japan could finally boast a centrally controlled navy, this was also the institutional beginning of the Imperial Japanese Navy.

In February 1872, the Ministry of War was replaced by a separate Army Ministry and Navy Ministry. In October 1873, Katsu Kaishū became Navy Minister.

Secondary Service (1872–1882) 

After the consolidation of the government the new Meiji state set about to build up national strength. The Meiji government honored the treaties with the Western powers signed during the Bakumatsu period with the ultimate goal of revising them, leading to a subsided threat from the sea. This however led to conflict with those disgruntled samurai who wanted to expel the westerners and with groups which opposed  the Meiji reforms. Internal dissent – including peasant uprisings – become a greater concern for the government, which curtailed plans for naval expansion as a result. In the immediate period from 1868 many members of the Meiji coalition advocated giving preference to maritime forces over the army and saw naval strength as paramount. In 1870 the new government drafted an ambitious plan to develop a navy with 200 ships organized into ten fleets. The plan was abandoned within a year due to lack of resources. Financial considerations were a major factor restricting the growth of the navy during the 1870s. Japan at the time was not a wealthy state. Soon, however, domestic rebellions, the Saga Rebellion (1874) and especially the Satsuma Rebellion (1877), forced the government to focus on land warfare, and the army gained prominence.

Naval policy, as expressed by the slogan Shusei Kokubō (literally: "Static Defense"), focused on coastal defenses, on a standing army (established with the assistance of the second French Military Mission to Japan), and a coastal navy that could act in a supportive role to drive an invading enemy from the coast. The resulting military organization followed the Rikushu Kaijū (Army first, Navy second) principle. This meant a defense designed to repel an enemy from Japanese territory, and the chief responsibility for that mission rested upon Japan's army; consequently, the army gained the bulk of the military expenditures. During the 1870s and 1880s, the Imperial Japanese Navy remained an essentially coastal-defense force, although the Meiji government continued to modernize it. Jo Sho Maru (soon renamed Ryūjō Maru) commissioned by Thomas Glover was launched at Aberdeen, Scotland on 27 March 1869.

British support and influence 

In 1870 an Imperial decree determined that Britain's Royal Navy should serve as the model for development, instead of the Netherlands navy. In 1873 a thirty-four-man British naval mission, headed by Lt. Comdr. Archibald Douglas, arrived in Japan. Douglas directed instruction at the Naval Academy at Tsukiji for several years, the mission remained in Japan until 1879, substantially advancing the development of the navy and firmly establishing British traditions within the Japanese navy from matters of seamanship to the style of its uniforms and the attitudes of its officers.

From September 1870, the English Lieutenant Horse, a former gunnery instructor for the Saga fief during the Bakumatsu period, was put in charge of gunnery practice on board the Ryūjō. In 1871, the ministry resolved to send 16 trainees abroad for training in naval sciences (14 to Great Britain, two to the United States), among which was Heihachirō Tōgō. Later, Commander L.P. Willan was hired in 1879 to train naval cadets.

Further modernization (1870s)

Private construction companies such as Ishikawajima and Kawasaki also emerged around this time.

First interventions abroad (Taiwan 1874, Korea 1875–76) 

During 1873, a plan to invade the Korean Peninsula, the Seikanron proposal made by Saigō Takamori, was narrowly abandoned by decision of the central government in Tokyo. In 1874, the Taiwan expedition was the first foray abroad of the new Imperial Japanese Navy and Army after the Mudan Incident of 1871, however the navy served largely as a transport force.

Various interventions in the Korean Peninsula continued in 1875–1876, starting with the Ganghwa Island incident provoked by the Japanese gunboat , leading to the dispatch of a large force of the Imperial Japanese Navy. As a result, the Japan–Korea Treaty of 1876 was signed, marking the official opening of Korea to foreign trade, and Japan's first example of Western-style interventionism and adoption of "unequal treaties" tactics.

In 1878, the Japanese cruiser Seiki sailed to Europe with an entirely Japanese crew.

Naval expansion (1882–1893)

First naval expansion bill

After the Imo Incident in July 1882, Iwakura Tomomi submitted a document to the daijō-kan titled "Opinions Regarding Naval Expansion" asserting that a strong navy was essential to maintaining the security of Japan. In furthering his argument, Iwakura suggested that domestic rebellions were no longer Japan's primary military concern and that naval affairs should take precedence over army concerns; a strong navy was more important than a sizable army to preserve the Japanese state. Furthermore, he justified that a large, modern navy, would have the added potential benefit of instilling Japan with greater international prestige and recognition, as navies were internationally recognized hallmarks of power and status. Iwakura also suggested that the Meiji government could support naval growth by increasing taxes on tobacco, sake, and soy.

After lengthy discussions, Iwakura eventually convinced the ruling coalition to support Japan's first multi-year naval expansion plan in history. In May 1883, the government approved a plan that, when completed, would add 32 warships over eight years at a cost of just over ¥26 million. This development was very significant for the navy, as the amount allocated virtually equaled the navy's entire budget between 1873 and 1882. The 1882 naval expansion plan succeeded in a large part because of Satsuma power, influence, and patronage. Between 19 August and 23 November 1882, Satsuma forces with Iwakura's leadership, worked tirelessly to secure support for the Navy's expansion plan. After uniting the other Satsuma members of the Dajokan, Iwakura approached the emperor the Meiji emperor arguing persuasively just as he did with the Dajokan, that naval expansion was critical to Japan's security and that the standing army of forty thousand men was more than sufficient for domestic purposes. While the government should direct the lion's share of future military appropriations toward naval matters, a powerful navy would legitimize an increase in tax revenue. On November 24, the emperor assembled select ministers of the daijō-kan together with military officers, and announced the need for increased tax revenues to provide adequate funding for military expansion, this was followed by an imperial re-script. The following month, in December, an annual ¥7.5-million tax increase on sake, soy, and tobacco was fully approved, in the hopes that it would provide ¥3.5 million annually for warship construction and ¥2.5 million for warship maintenance. In February 1883, the government directed further revenues from other ministries to support an increase in the navy's warship construction and purchasing budget. By March 1883, the navy secured the ¥6.5 million required annually to support an eight-year expansion plan, this was the largest that the Imperial Japanese Navy had secured in its young existence.

However, naval expansion remained a highly contentious issue for both the government and the navy throughout much of the 1880s. Overseas advances in naval technology increased the costs of purchasing large components of a modern fleet, so that by 1885 cost overruns had jeopardized the entire 1883 plan. Furthermore, increased costs coupled with decreased domestic tax revenues, heightened concern and political tension in Japan regarding funding naval expansion.
In 1883, two large warships were ordered from British shipyards.

The naval architect Sasō Sachū designed these on the line of the Elswick class of protected cruisers but with superior specifications. An arms race was taking place with China however, who equipped herself with two 7,335 ton German-built battleships (Ting Yüan and Chen-Yüan). Unable to confront the Chinese fleet with only two modern cruisers, Japan resorted to French assistance to build a large, modern fleet which could prevail in the upcoming conflict.

Influence of the French "Jeune École" (1880s)

During the 1880s, France took the lead in influence, due to its "Jeune École" ("young school") doctrine, favoring small, fast warships, especially cruisers and torpedo boats, against bigger units. The choice of France may also have been influenced by the Minister of the Navy, who happened to be Enomoto Takeaki at that time (Navy Minister 1880–1885), a former ally of the French during the Boshin War. Also, Japan was uneasy with being dependent on Great Britain, at a time when Great Britain was very close to China.

The Meiji government issued its First Naval Expansion bill in 1882, requiring the construction of 48 warships, of which 22 were to be torpedo boats. The naval successes of the French Navy against China in the Sino-French War of 1883–85 seemed to validate the potential of torpedo boats, an approach which was also attractive to the limited resources of Japan. In 1885, the new Navy slogan became Kaikoku Nippon (Jp:海国日本, "Maritime Japan").

In 1885, the leading French Navy engineer Émile Bertin was hired for four years to reinforce the Japanese Navy and to direct the construction of the arsenals of Kure and Sasebo. He developed the Sankeikan class of cruisers; three units featuring a single powerful main gun, the  Canet gun. Altogether, Bertin supervised the building of more than 20 units. They helped establish the first true modern naval force of Japan. It allowed Japan to achieve mastery in the building of large units, since some of the ships were imported, and some others were built domestically at the arsenal of Yokosuka:
 3 coastal warships of 4,278 tons.
 1 frigate, the 1,600 ton , built at Yokosuka.
 1 aviso: the 726 ton , built in France.
 16 torpedo boats of 54 tons each, built in France by the Companie du Creusot in 1888, and assembled in Japan.

This period also allowed Japan "to embrace the revolutionary new technologies embodied in torpedoes, torpedo-boats and mines, of which the French at the time were probably the world's best exponents". Japan acquired its first torpedoes in 1884, and established a "Torpedo Training Center" at Yokosuka in 1886.

These ships, ordered during the fiscal years 1885 and 1886, were the last major orders placed with France. The unexplained sinking of  en route from France to Japan in December 1886, created embarrassment however.

British shipbuilding

In 1889, she ordered the Clyde-built , which defined the type for armored cruisers.

Between 1882 and 1918, ending with the visit of the French Military Mission to Japan, the Imperial Japanese Navy stopped relying on foreign instructors altogether. In 1886, she manufactured her own prismatic powder, and in 1892 one of her officers invented a powerful explosive, the Shimose powder.

Sino-Japanese War (1894–1895)

Japan continued the modernization of its navy, especially as China was also building a powerful modern fleet with foreign, especially German, assistance, and as a result tensions were building between the two countries over Korea.
Hence, initiating hostilities at the time was not ideal, and the navy was far less confident than the Japanese army about the outcome of a war with China.

Japan's main strategy was to gain command of the sea as this was critical to the operations on land. An early victory over the Beiyang fleet would allow Japan to transport troops and material to the Korean Peninsula, however any prolongation of the war would increase the risk of intervention by the European powers with interests in East Asia. The army's Fifth Division would land at Chemulpo on the western coast of Korea, both to engage and push Chinese forces northwest up the peninsula and to draw the Beiyang Fleet into the Yellow Sea, where it would be engaged in decisive battle. Depending upon the outcome of this engagement, Japan would make one of three choices; If the Combined Fleet were to win decisively, the larger part of the Japanese army would undertake immediate landings on the coast between Shanhaiguan and Tianjin in order to defeat the Chinese army and bring the war to a swift conclusion. If the engagement were to be a draw and neither side gained control of the sea, the army would concentrate on the occupation of Korea. Lastly, if the Combined Fleet was defeated and consequently lost command of the sea, the bulk of the army would remain in Japan and prepare to repel a Chinese invasion, while the Fifth Division in Korea would be ordered to hang on and fight a rearguard action.

A Japanese squadron intercepted and defeated a Chinese force near Korean island of Pungdo; damaging a cruiser, sinking a loaded transport, capturing one gunboat and destroying another. The battle occurred before the war was officially declared on 1 August 1894. On August 10, the Japanese ventured into the Yellow Sea to seek out the Beiyang Fleet and bombarded both Weihaiwei and Port Arthur. Finding only small vessels in either harbor, the Combined Fleet returned to Korea to support further landings off the Chinese coast. The Beiyang Fleet under the command of Admiral Ding was initially ordered to stay close to the Chinese coast while reinforcements were sent to Korea by land. But as Japanese troops had very quickly advanced northward from Seoul to Pyongyang the Chinese decided to rush troops to Korea by sea under a naval escort, in mid-September.
Concurrently, because there had been no decisive encounter at sea, the Japanese decided to send more troops to Korea. Early in September, the navy was directed to support further landings and to support the army on Korea's western coast. As Japanese ground forces then moved north to attack Pyongyang, Admiral Ito correctly guessed that the Chinese would attempt to reinforce their army in Korea by sea. On 14 September, the Combined Fleet went north to search the Korean and Chinese coasts and to bring the Beiyang Fleet to battle. On 17 September 1894, the Japanese encountered them off the mouth of the Yalu River. The Combined Fleet then devastated the Beiyang Fleet during the battle, in which the Chinese fleet lost eight out of 12 warships. The Chinese subsequently retreated behind the Weihaiwei fortifications. However, they were then surprised by Japanese troops, who outflanked the harbour's defenses in coordination with the navy. The remnants of the Beiyang Fleet were destroyed at Weihaiwei. Although Japan turned out victorious, the two large German-made Chinese ironclad battleships (Dingyuan and Zhenyuan) remained almost impervious to Japanese guns, highlighting the need for bigger capital ships in the Imperial Japanese Navy. The next step of the Imperial Japanese Navy's expansion would thus involve a combination of heavily armed large warships, with smaller and innovative offensive units permitting aggressive tactics.

As a result of the conflict, under the Treaty of Shimonoseki (April 17, 1895), Taiwan and the Pescadores Islands were transferred to Japan. The Imperial Japanese Navy took possession of the island and quelled opposition movements between March to October 1895. Japan also obtained the Liaodong Peninsula, although she was forced by Russia, Germany and France to return it to China (Triple Intervention), only to see Russia take possession of it soon after.

Suppression of the Boxer rebellion (1900)

The Imperial Japanese Navy further intervened in China in 1900 by participating, together with Western Powers, in the suppression of the Chinese Boxer Rebellion. The Navy supplied the largest number of warships (18 out of a total of 50) and delivered the largest contingent of troops among the intervening nations (20,840 Imperial Japanese Army and Navy soldiers, out of a total of 54,000).

The conflict allowed Japan to enter combat together with Western nations and to acquire first-hand understanding of their fighting methods.

Naval Buildup and tensions with Russia

Following the war against China, the Triple Intervention under Russian leadership, pressured Japan to renounce its claim to the Liaodong Peninsula. The Japanese were well aware of the naval power the three countries possessed in East Asian waters, particularly Russia. Faced with little choice the Japanese retroceded the territory back to China for an additional 30 million taels (roughly ¥45 million). With the humiliation of the forced return of the Liaodong Peninsula, Japan began to build up its military strength in preparation for future confrontations. The political capital and public support for the navy gained as a result of the recent conflict with China, also encouraged popular and legislative support for naval expansion.

In 1895, Yamamoto Gombei was assigned to compose a study of Japan's future naval needs. He believed that Japan should have sufficient naval strength to not only to deal with a single hypothetical enemy separately, but to also confront any fleet from two combined powers that might be dispatched against Japan from overseas waters. He assumed that with their conflicting global interests, it was highly unlikely that the British and Russians would ever join together in a war against Japan, considering it more likely that a major power like Russia in alliance with a lesser naval power, would dispatch a portion of their fleet against Japan. Yamamoto therefore calculated that four battleships would be the main battle force that a major power could divert from their other naval commitments to use against Japan and he also added two more battleships that might be contributed to such a naval expedition by a lesser hostile power. In order to achieve victory Japan should have a force of six of the largest battleships supplemented by four armored cruisers of at least 7,000 tons. The centerpiece of this expansion was to be the acquisition of four new battleships in addition to the two which were already being completed in Britain being part of an earlier construction program. Yamamoto was also advocating the construction of a balanced fleet. Battleships would be supplemented by lesser warships of various types, including cruisers that could seek out and pursue the enemy and a sufficient number of destroyers and torpedo boats capable of striking the enemy in home ports. As a result, the program also included the construction of twenty-three destroyers, sixty-three torpedo boats, and an expansion of Japanese shipyards and repair and training facilities. In 1897, because of fears that the size of the Russian fleet assigned to East Asian waters could be larger than previously believed, the plan was revised. Although budgetary limitations simply could not permit the construction of another battleship squadron, the new Harvey and KC armor plates could resist all but the largest AP shells. Japan could now acquire armored cruisers that could take the place in the battle line. Hence, with new armor and lighter but more powerful quick-firing guns, this new cruiser type was superior to many older battleships still afloat. Subsequently, the revisions to the ten-year plan led to the four protected cruisers were replaced by additional two armored cruisers. As a consequence the "Six-Six Fleet" was born, with six battleships and six armored cruisers.

The program for a 260,000-ton navy to be completed over a ten-year period in two stages of construction, with the total cost being ¥280 million, was approved by the cabinet in late 1895 and funded by the Diet in early 1896. Of the total warship acquisitions accounted for just over ¥200 million. The first stage would begin in 1896 and be completed by 1902; the second would run from 1897 to 1905. The program was financed significantly from the Chinese indemnity secured after the First Sino-Japanese War. This was used to fund the bulk of the naval expansion, roughly ¥139 million, with public loans and existing government revenue providing the rest of the financing required over the ten years of the program. Japan's industrial resources at the time were inadequate for the construction of a fleet of armored warships domestically, as the country was still in the process of developing and acquiring the industrial infrastructure for the construction of major naval vessels. Consequently, the overwhelming majority was built in British shipyards. With the completion of the fleet, Japan would become the fourth strongest naval power in the world in a single decade. In 1902, Japan formed an alliance with Britain, the terms of which stated that if Japan went to war in the Far East and that a third power entered the fight against Japan, then Britain would come to the aid of the Japanese. This was a check to prevent any third power from intervening militarily in any future war with Russia.

Russo-Japanese War (1904–1905)

The new fleet consisted of:
 6 battleships (all British-built)
 8 armored cruisers (4 British-, 2 Italian-, 1 German-built Yakumo, and 1 French-built Azuma)
 9 cruisers (5 Japanese, 2 British and 2 U.S.-built)
 24 destroyers (16 British- and 8 Japanese-built)
 63 torpedo boats (26 German-, 10 British-, 17 French-, and 10 Japanese-built)

One of these battleships, which was among the most powerful warships afloat when completed, was ordered from the Vickers shipyard in the United Kingdom at the end of 1898, for delivery to Japan in 1902. Commercial shipbuilding in Japan was exhibited by construction of the twin screw steamer Aki-Maru, built for Nippon Yusen Kaisha by the Mitsubishi Dockyard & Engine Works, Nagasaki. The Imperial Japanese cruiser  was built at the Union Iron Works in San Francisco, California.

These dispositions culminated with the Russo-Japanese War. At the Battle of Tsushima, Admiral Togo (flag in Mikasa) led the Japanese Grand Fleet into the decisive engagement of the war. The Russian fleet was almost completely annihilated: out of 38 Russian ships, 21 were sunk, seven captured, six disarmed, 4,545 Russian servicemen died and 6,106 were taken prisoner. On the other hand, the Japanese only lost 116 men and three torpedo boats. These victories broke Russian strength in East Asia, and triggered waves of mutinies in the Russian Navy at Sevastopol, Vladivostok and Kronstadt, peaking in June with the Potemkin uprising, thereby contributing to the Russian Revolution of 1905. The victory at Tsushima elevated the stature of the navy.

The Imperial Japanese Navy acquired its first submarines in 1905 from Electric Boat Company, barely four years after the U.S. Navy had commissioned its own first submarine, . The ships were Holland designs and were developed under the supervision of Electric Boat's representative, Arthur L. Busch. These five submarines (known as Holland Type VII's) were shipped in kit form to Japan (October 1904) and then assembled at the Yokosuka, Kanagawa Yokosuka Naval Arsenal, to become hulls No.1 through 5, and became operational at the end of 1905.

Towards an autonomous national navy (1905–1914)

Japan continued in its efforts to build up a strong national naval industry. Following a strategy of "copy, improve, innovate", foreign ships of various designs were usually analysed in depth, their specifications often improved on, and then were purchased in pairs so as to organize comparative testing and improvements. Over the years, the importation of whole classes of ships was progressively substituted by local assembly, and then complete local production, starting with the smallest ships, such as torpedo boats and cruisers in the 1880s, to finish with whole battleships in the early 20th century. The last major purchase was in 1913 when the battlecruiser  was purchased from the Vickers shipyard. By 1918, there was no aspect of shipbuilding technology where Japanese capabilities fell significantly below world standards.

The period immediately after Tsushima also saw the IJN, under the influence of the navalist theoretician Satō Tetsutarō, adopt an explicit policy of building for a potential future conflict against the United States Navy. Satō called for a battlefleet at least 70% as strong as that of the US. In 1907, the official policy of the Navy became an 'eight-eight fleet' of eight modern battleships and eight battlecruisers. However, financial constraints prevented this ideal ever becoming a reality.

By 1920, the Imperial Japanese Navy was the world's third largest navy and a leader in naval development:
 Following its 1897 invention by Marconi, the Japanese Navy was the first navy to employ wireless telegraphy in combat, at the 1905 Battle of Tsushima.
However, due to a lack of material, she was completed with a mixed battery of rifles, launched on 15 November 1906, and completed on 25 March 1910.
 Between 1903 and 1910, Japan began to build battleships domestically.

World War I (1914–1918)

Japan entered World War I on the side of the Entente, against Germany and Austria-Hungary, as a consequence of the 1902 Anglo-Japanese Alliance. In the Siege of Tsingtao, the Imperial Japanese Navy helped seize the German colony of Tsingtao. During the siege, beginning on 5 September 1914,  conducted the world's first successful sea-launched air strikes. On 6 September 1914, in the very first air-sea battle in history, a Farman aircraft launched by Wakamiya attacked the Austro-Hungarian cruiser  and the German gunboat Jaguar off Tsingtao. from Jiaozhou Bay. Four Maurice Farman seaplanes bombarded German land targets like communication and command centers, and damaged a German minelayer in the Tsingtao peninsula from September to 6 November 1914 when the Germans surrendered.

A battle group was also sent to the central Pacific in August and September to pursue the German East Asiatic squadron, which then moved into the Southern Atlantic, where it encountered British naval forces and was destroyed at the Falkland Islands. Japan also seized German possessions in northern Micronesia, which remained Japanese colonies until the end of World War II, under the League of Nations' South Seas Mandate. Hard pressed in Europe, where she had only a narrow margin of superiority against Germany, Britain had requested, but was denied, the loan of Japan's four newly built Kongō-class battlecruisers (and ), some of the first ships in the world to be equipped with  guns, and the most formidable battlecruisers in the world at the time.

Following a further request by the British and the initiation of unrestricted submarine warfare by Germany, in March 1917, the Japanese sent a special force to the Mediterranean. This force, consisted of one protected cruiser,  as flotilla leader and eight of the Navy's newest Kaba-class destroyers (and ), under Admiral Satō Kōzō, was based in Malta and efficiently protected allied shipping between Marseille, Taranto, and ports in Egypt until the end of the War. They were later joined by the cruiser . By the end of the war, the Japanese had escorted 788 allied transports. One destroyer, Sakaki, was torpedoed on 11 June 1917 by a German submarine with the loss of 59 officers and men. A memorial at the Kalkara Naval Cemetery in Malta was dedicated to the 72 Japanese sailors who died in action during the Mediterranean convoy patrols.

In 1917, Japan exported 12 Arabe-class destroyers to France. After the conflict, the Japanese Navy received seven German submarines as spoils of war, which were brought to Japan and analysed, contributing greatly to the development of the Japanese submarine industry.

Interwar years (1918–1937)

By 1921, Japan's naval expenditure reached nearly 32% of the national government budget. In 1941, the Imperial Japanese Navy possessed 10 battleships, 10 aircraft carriers, 38 cruisers (heavy and light), 112 destroyers, 65 submarines, and various auxiliary ships.

Washington treaty system

In the years following after the end of First World War the naval construction programs of the three greatest naval powers Britain, Japan and the United States had threatened to set off a new potentially dangerous and expensive naval arms race. The subsequent Washington Naval Treaty of 1922 became one of history's most effective arms reduction programs, setting up a system of ratios between the five signatory powers. The United States and Britain were each allocated 525,000 tons of capital ships, Japan 315,000, and France and Italy to 175,000, ratios of 5:3:1.75. Also agreed to was a ten-year moratorium on battleship construction, though replacement of battleships reaching 20 years of service was permitted. Maximum limits of 35,000 tons and 16-inch guns were also set. Carriers were restricted with the same 5:5:3 ratio, with Japan allotted 81,000 tons.

Many naval leaders in Japan's delegation were outraged by these limitations, as Japan would always be behind its chief rivals. However, in the end it was concluded that even these unfavorable limitations would be better than an unrestricted arms race with the industrially dominant United States. The Washington System may have made Japan a junior partner with the US and Britain, but it also curtailed the rise of China and the Soviet Union, who both sought to challenge Japan in Asia.

The Washington Treaty did not restrict the building of ships other than battleships and carriers, resulting in a building race for heavy cruisers. These were limited to 10,000 tons and 8-inch guns. The Japanese were also able to get some concessions, most notably the battleship , which had been partly funded by donations from schoolchildren and would have been scrapped under the terms of the treaty.

The Treaty also dictated that the United States, Britain, and Japan could not expand their Western Pacific fortifications. Japan specifically could not militarize the Kurile Islands, the Bonin Islands, Amami-Oshima, the Loochoo Islands, Formosa and the Pescadores.

Development of naval aviation

Japan at times continued to solicit foreign expertise in areas in which the IJN was inexperienced, such as naval aviation. The Japanese navy had closely monitored the progress of aviation of the three Allied naval powers during World War I and concluded that Britain had made the greatest advances in naval aviation,. The Sempill Mission led by Captain William Forbes-Sempill, a former officer in the Royal Air Force experienced in the design and testing of Royal Navy aircraft during the First World War. The mission consisted of 27 members, who were largely personnel with experience in naval aviation and included pilots and engineers from several British aircraft manufacturing firms. The British technical mission left for Japan in September with the objective of helping the Imperial Japanese Navy develop and improve the proficiency of its naval air arm. The mission arrived at Kasumigaura Naval Air Station the following month, in November 1921, and stayed in Japan for 18 months.

The mission brought to Kasumigaura well over a hundred British aircraft comprising twenty different models, five of which were then currently in service with the Royal Navy's Fleet Air Arm. The Japanese were trained on several, such as the Gloster Sparrowhawk, then a frontline fighter. The Japanese would go on to order 50 of these aircraft from Gloster, and build 40. These planes eventually provided the inspiration for the design of a number of Japanese naval aircraft. Technicians become familiar with the newest aerial weapons and equipment-torpedoes, bombs, machine guns, cameras, and communications gear. Japanese naval aviators were trained in various techniques such as torpedo bombing, flight control and carrier landing and take-offs.

The mission also brought the plans of the most recent British aircraft carriers, such as HMS Argus and HMS Hermes, which influenced the final stages of the development of the carrier . By the time its last members had returned to Britain, the Japanese had acquired a reasonable grasp of the latest aviation technology and taken the first steps toward having an effective naval air force. Japanese naval aviation also, both in technology and in doctrine, continued to be dependent on the British model for most of the 1920s.

Naval developments during the interwar years

Between the wars, Japan took the lead in many areas of warship development:
 In 1921, it launched , the first purpose-designed aircraft carrier in the world to be completed, and subsequently developed a fleet of aircraft carriers second to none.
 In keeping with its doctrine, the Imperial Japanese Navy was the first to mount  guns (in ),  guns (in ), and began the only battleships ever to mount  guns (in the ).
 In 1928, she launched the innovative , introducing enclosed dual  turrets capable of anti-aircraft fire. The new destroyer design was soon emulated by other navies. The Fubukis also featured the first torpedo tubes enclosed in splinterproof turrets.
 Japan developed the  oxygen fuelled Type 93 torpedo, generally recognized as the best torpedo of World War II.

Doctrinal debates
The Imperial Japanese Navy was faced before and during World War II with considerable challenges, probably more so than any other navy in the world. Japan, like Britain, was almost entirely dependent on foreign resources to supply its economy. To achieve Japan's expansionist policies, IJN had to secure and protect distant sources of raw material (especially Southeast Asian oil and raw materials), controlled by foreign countries (Britain, France, and the Netherlands). To achieve this goal, she had to build large warships capable of long range assault. In the years before World War II, the IJN began to structure itself specifically to fight the United States. A long stretch of militaristic expansion and the start of the Second Sino-Japanese War in 1937 had exacerbated tensions with the United States, which was seen as a rival of Japan.

This was in conflict with Japan's doctrine of "decisive battle" (Kantai kessen, which did not require long range), in which IJN would allow the U.S. to sail across the Pacific, using submarines to damage it, then engage the U.S. Navy in a "decisive battle area" near Japan after inflicting such attrition. This is also in keeping with the theory of Alfred T. Mahan, to which every major navy subscribed before World War II, in which wars would be decided by engagements between opposing surface fleets, as they had been for over 300 years.

Following the dictates of Satō (who doubtless was influenced by Mahan), it was the basis for Japan's demand for a 70% ratio (10:10:7) at the Washington Naval Conference, which would give Japan superiority in the "decisive battle area", and the U.S.' insistence on a 60% ratio, which meant parity. Japan, unlike other navies, clung to it even after it had been demonstrated to be obsolete.

It was also in conflict with her past experience. Japan's numerical and industrial inferiority led her to seek technical superiority (fewer, but faster, more powerful ships), qualitative superiority (better training), and aggressive tactics (daring and speedy attacks overwhelming the enemy, a recipe for success in her previous conflicts), but failed to take account of any of these traits. Her opponents in any future Pacific War would not face the political and geographical constraints of her previous wars, nor did she allow for losses in ships and crews.

During the pre-war years, two schools of thought battled over whether the navy should be organized around powerful battleships, ultimately able to defeat American ones in Japanese waters, or aircraft carriers. Neither really prevailed, and both types were developed. The result was that neither ended up with overwhelming strength over its American adversary.

A consistent weakness of gunned Japanese warship development was the tendency to incorporate too much armament, and too much engine power, relative to ship size (a side-effect of the Washington Treaty limitations on overall tonnage), leading to shortcomings in stability, protection and structural strength.

Circle Plans

In response to the London Treaty of 1930, the Japanese started a series of naval construction programs or hoju keikaku (naval replenishment, or construction, plans), known unofficially as the maru keikaku (circle plans). Between 1930 and the outbreak of the Second World War there were four of these "Circle plans" which were drawn up in 1931, 1934, 1937, and 1939. The Circle One was plan approved in 1931, provided for the construction of 39 ships to be laid down between 1931 and 1934, centering on four of the new s, and expansion of the Naval Air Service to 14 Air Groups. However, plans for a second Circle plan were delayed by the Tomozuru capsizing and heavy typhoon damage to the Fourth fleet, when it was revealed that the basic designs of many Japanese warships were flawed due to poor construction techniques and instability caused by attempting to mount too much weaponry on too small a displacement hull. As a result, most of the naval budget in 1932–1933 was absorbed in modifications to rectify the issues with existing equipment.

The plan also continued the buildup in naval aircraft and authorized the creation of eight new Naval Air Groups. With Japan's renunciation of naval treaties in December 1934, Circle Three plan was approved in 1937, its third major naval building program since 1930. A six-year effort, it called for construction of new warships that were free from the old treaty restrictions, while concentrating on qualitative superiority to compensate for Japan's quantitative deficiencies compared with the United States. Also funded was upgrading of the four s and the two Tone class cruisers, which were under construction, by replacing their 6-inch main batteries with 8-inch guns. In aviation, Circle Three aimed at maintaining parity with American naval air power by adding 827 planes for allocation to fourteen planned land-based air groups, and increasing carrier aircraft by nearly 1,000. To accommodate the new land aircraft the plan called for several new airfields to be built or expanded; it also provided for a significant increase in the size of the navy's production facilities for aircraft and aerial weapons.

In 1938, with the construction of Circle Three under way, the Japanese had begun to consider preparations for the next major expansion, which was scheduled for 1940. However, with the American second Vinson act in 1938, the Japanese accelerated the Circle Four six-year expansion program, which was approved in September 1939. Circle Four's goal was doubling Japan's naval air strength in just five years, delivering air superiority in East Asia and the western Pacific. It called for building of two , a fleet carrier, six of a new class of planned escort carriers, six cruisers, twenty-two destroyers, and twenty-five submarines. The real emphasis, however, was on naval air power, in which the Japanese hoped to take the lead.

To achieve Asian air superiority Circle Four planned for the acquisition of 175 ship based aircraft and nearly 1,500 land based aircraft to be allocated to seventy-five new air groups. Upon completion of this expansion Japan would have 874 ship-based aircraft and 3,341 aircraft in 128 land based air groups, 65 of these being combat air groups and 63 training.

Conflict in China

The China War was of great importance and value to the development of Japanese naval aviation, demonstrating how aircraft could contribute to the projection of naval power ashore.

The IJN had two primary responsibilities during it: to support amphibious operations on the Chinese coast and the strategic aerial bombardment of Chinese cities – the first time any naval air arm had been given such tasks.

From the onset of hostilities in 1937 until forces were diverted to combat for the Pacific war in 1941, naval aircraft played a key role in military operations on the Chinese mainland. These began with attacks on military installations largely in the Yangtze River basin along the Chinese coast by Japanese carrier aircraft. Naval involvement during the conflict peaked in 1938–39 with the heavy bombardment of Chinese cities deep in the interior by land-based medium bombers and concluded during 1941 with an attempt by both, carrier-borne and land-based, tactical aircraft to cut communication and transportation routes in southern China. Although, the 1937–41 air offensives failed in their political and psychological aims, they did reduce the flow of strategic materiel to China and for a time improved the Japanese military situation in the central and southern parts of the country.

World War II

To effectively combat the numerically superior American navy, the Japanese had devoted a large amount of resources to create a force of superior quality. Betting on the success of aggressive tactics which stemmed from Mahanian doctrine and the concept of decisive battle, Japan did not invest significantly in capabilities needed to protect its long shipping lines against enemy submarines, particularly under-investing in the vital area of antisubmarine warfare (both escort ships and escort carriers), and in the specialized training and organization to support it. Imperial Japan's reluctance to use its submarine fleet for commerce raiding and failure to secure its communications also hastened its defeat.The Japanese Navy also underinvested in intelligence and had hardly any agents active in the United States when the war started; several Japanese Naval officers credited lack of information about the US Navy as another major factor in their defeat.

The IJN launched a surprise attack on Pearl Harbor, killing 2,403 Americans and crippling the U.S. Pacific Fleet. During the first six months of the Pacific War, the IJN enjoyed spectacular success inflicting heavy defeats on Allied forces. Allied navies were devastated during the Japanese conquest of Southeast Asia. Japanese naval aircraft were also responsible for the sinkings of HMS Prince of Wales and HMS Repulse which was the first time that capital ships were sunk by aerial attack while underway. In April 1942, the Indian Ocean raid drove the Royal Navy from South East Asia.

After these successes, the IJN now concentrated on the elimination and neutralization of strategic points from where the Allies could launch counteroffensives against Japanese conquests. However, at Coral Sea the Japanese were forced to abandon their attempts to isolate Australia while the defeat in the Midway Campaign saw the Japanese forced on the defensive. The campaign in the Solomon Islands, in which the Japanese lost the war of attrition, was the most decisive; the Japanese failed to commit enough forces in sufficient time. During 1943 the Allies were able to reorganize their forces and American industrial strength began to turn the tide of the war. American forces ultimately managed to gain the upper hand through a vastly greater industrial output and a modernization of its air and naval forces.

In 1943, the Japanese also turned their attention to the defensive perimeters of their previous conquests. Forces on Japanese held islands in Micronesia were to absorb and wear down an expected American counteroffensive. However, American industrial power become apparent and the military forces that faced the Japanese in 1943 were overwhelming in firepower and equipment. From the end of 1943 to 1944 Japan's defensive perimeter failed to hold.

The defeat at the Philippine Sea was a disaster for Japanese naval air power with American pilots terming the slanted air/sea battle the Great Marianas Turkey Shoot, mostly going in the favor of the U.S., while the battle of Leyte Gulf led to the destruction of a large part of the surface fleet. During the last phase of the war, the Imperial Japanese Navy resorted to a series of desperate measures, including a variety of Special Attack Units which were popularly called kamikaze. By May 1945, most of the Imperial Japanese Navy had been sunk and the remnants had taken refuge in Japan's harbors. By July 1945, the Nagato was the only remaining ship of the Imperial Japanese Navy's capital ships that had not been sunk in raids by the United States Navy.

Legacy

Self-Defense Forces

Following Japan's surrender and subsequent occupation by the Allies at the conclusion of World War II, the Imperial Japanese Navy, along with the rest of the Japanese military, was dissolved in 1945. In the new constitution of Japan which was drawn up in 1947, Article 9 specifies that "The Japanese people forever renounce war as a sovereign right of the nation and the threat or use of force as a means of settling international disputes." The prevalent view in Japan is that this article allows for military forces to be kept for the purposes of self-defense. Article 9 of the Japanese Constitution
In 1952, the Coastal Safety Force was formed within the Maritime Safety Agency, incorporating the minesweeping fleet and other military vessels, mainly destroyers, given by the United States. In 1954, the Coastal Safety Force was separated, and the JMSDF was formally created as the naval branch of the Japanese Self-Defense Force (JSDF), following the passage of the 1954 Self-Defense Forces Law. Japan's current navy falls under the umbrella of the Japan Self-Defense Forces (JSDF) as the Japan Maritime Self-Defense Force (JMSDF).

See also

 Admiral of the Fleet (Japan)
 Carrier Striking Task Force
 Control Faction and Imperial Way Faction – Army political groups about government reform
 Fleet Faction and Treaty Faction – Navy political groups about naval treaties
 Imperial Japanese Naval Academy
 Imperial Japanese Navy Armor Units
 Imperial Japanese Navy Aviation Bureau
 Imperial Japanese Navy bases and facilities
 Imperial Rescript to Soldiers and Sailors
 Japanese nationalism
 Japanese Special Naval Landing Forces
 Kaientai
 List of Japanese Navy ships and war vessels in World War II
 List of weapons of the Japanese Navy
 Marshal (Japan)
 May 15 Incident – coup d'état with Navy support
 Recruitment in the Imperial Japanese Navy
 "Strike South" and "Strike North" Doctrines
 Tokkeitai – Navy Military Police
 Tomogashima

Notes

References
 
 
 
 Howe, Christopher (1996) The origins of Japanese Trade Supremacy, Development and technology in Asia from 1540 to the Pacific War, University of Chicago Press 
 Ireland, Bernard (1996) Jane's Battleships of the 20th Century 
 
 
 Lyon, D.J. (1976) World War II warships, Excalibur Books

Further reading
 
 
 Boxer, C.R. (1993) The Christian Century in Japan 1549–1650, 
 
 Delorme, Pierre, Les Grandes Batailles de l'Histoire, Port-Arthur 1904, Socomer Editions (French)
 Gardiner, Robert (editor) (2001) Steam, Steel and Shellfire, The Steam Warship 1815–1905, 
 
 
 
 Nagazumi, Yōko (永積洋子) Red Seal Ships (朱印船),  (Japanese)
 Polak, Christian. (2001). Soie et lumières: L'âge d'or des échanges franco-japonais (des origines aux années 1950). Tokyo: Chambre de Commerce et d'Industrie Française du Japon, Hachette Fujin Gahōsha (アシェット婦人画報社).
 Polak, Christian. (2002). 絹と光: 知られざる日仏交流100年の歴史 (江戶時代1950年代) Kinu to hikariō: shirarezaru Nichi-Futsu kōryū 100-nen no rekishi (Edo jidai-1950-nendai). Tokyo: Ashetto Fujin Gahōsha, 2002. ; 
 Seki, Eiji. (2006). Mrs. Ferguson's Tea-Set, Japan and the Second World War: The Global Consequences Following Germany's Sinking of the SS Automedon in 1940. London: Global Oriental.   (cloth) [reprinted by University of Hawaii Press, Honolulu, 2007 – previously announced as Sinking of the SS Automedon and the Role of the Japanese Navy: A New Interpretation.]
 Tōgō Shrine and Tōgō Association (東郷神社・東郷会), Togo Heihachiro in images, illustrated Meiji Navy (図説東郷平八郎、目で見る明治の海軍), (Japanese)
 Japanese submarines 潜水艦大作戦, Jinbutsu publishing (新人物従来社) (Japanese)

External links

 Axis History Factbook – Imperial Japanese Navy (IJN)
 Nobunaga's ironclad navy
 Hiroshi Nishida's IJN site
 Imperial Japanese Navy page
 Imperial Japanese Navy Awards of the Golden Kite in World War 2, a Note
 Imperial Japanese Navy in World War 1, 1914–18 including warship losses 

 
Disbanded navies
Empire of Japan
Military of the Empire of Japan
.
1869 establishments in Japan
1945 disestablishments in Japan
Japanese Navy
Japanese Navy
Attack on Pearl Harbor
Naval history of World War II
Articles containing video clips